Ret. 2nd Lt. Irma Cameron Dryden (May 28, 1920 – September 17, 2020) was a nurse for the Tuskegee Airmen during WWII.

Biography
Dryden was born in New York City in 1920 and died in 2020. She graduated from the Harlem Hospital School of Nursing in 1942.

Her father was a dental technician and her mother was a school teacher. She married Tuskegee Airman Charles W. Dryden in 1943.

See also
 Executive Order 9981
 List of Tuskegee Airmen
 Military history of African Americans
 The Tuskegee Airmen (movie)

References

1920 births
2020 deaths
People from New York City
Military personnel from Tuskegee, Alabama
Tuskegee Airmen
Tuskegee University
Burials at Arlington National Cemetery
African-American centenarians
American centenarians
Women centenarians
21st-century African-American people
African-American nurses